or  is a traditional dish from Central America.  Consisting of rice and beans as a base, gallo pinto has a long history and is important to Nicaraguan identity and culture, just as rice and beans variations are equally important in many Latin American cultures as well.

The beans in gallo pinto are quickly cooked until the juice is almost consumed, then combined with prepared rice and other ingredients such as cooked bell peppers, coriander, chopped onions, and garlic.

Etymology
Gallo pinto means "spotted rooster" in Spanish. The name is said to originate in the multi-colored or speckled appearance that results from cooking the rice with black or red beans. The term may also be shortened depending on the region.

History 

Gallo pinto is one of many various Latin American plates that involve the preparation of the most integral ingredients for many cultures: rice and beans. Gallo pinto is considered to be a product of mestizos; a combination of beans, cultivated by Indigenous people of pre-Columbian time, and rice, a grain introduced by the Spanish.

Rice, originally from Asia, was introduced by Arabs in Spain and became a main but versatile ingredients in the 15th and 16th centuries. With the Spanish colonization of the Americas, the Spanish introduced rice quickly to Mexico and South America. It is suggested that within the 18th century, the cultivation of rice became relevant to Central America. Asian rice was cultivated by Africans in the neolithic period, and with their arrival to the Americas as slaves by Europeans, they were already accustomed to eating rice. So this occurred as well with beans, which were cultivated centuries prior in Mesoamerica. On their travels to America, slaves were given bowls and a wooden spoon from which they ate twice a day. They ate primarily beans and European or African rice, along with maize, yams, cassava, and sponge cake.

As Africans were forced to settle in the continent, various forms of rice and beans began to take form. Because the Americas had many types of beans cultivated by Indigenous people, they gave rise to a range of dishes when combined with rice.

Regional variations

Gallo pinto is found in Costa Rica, Guatemala, Nicaragua and Panama. In the Caribbean areas of these countries it is possible to find rice and beans, a similar dish prepared with coconut milk.

Costa Rica 
In Costa Rica there are two main variations: 
 Valle Central: gallo pinto is more moist, usually prepared with black beans, less greasy and is seasoned with chili, cilantro and onions. One variant includes Lizano sauce.
 Guanacaste: with a more fatty and roasted gallo pinto; made with red beans.

Nicaragua
In Nicaragua, gallo pinto is made mainly with red beans. In addition, vegetable oil is used for cooking (includes onions). The gallo pinto can be eaten in Nicaragua at any time and is the main companion of the different dishes sold in a fritanga (food stall).

See also
 List of legume dishes
 Rice and beans#International dishes and variations, for a list of similar dishes made with rice and beans.

References

Legume dishes
Rice dishes
Costa Rican cuisine
National dishes
Nicaraguan cuisine